Cherian/Cheriyan is a Syrian Christian surname of West Asian (Hebrew-Aramaic) origin, presumed to be a derivative of Zecharya (Zacharias or Zechariah) and a variant of Zacharias popular among the Christian community of Kerala, southern India.
The final -n is the Malayalam third-person masculine singular suffix.

In India it is mostly found only as a given name although this trend is changing in the present generations, but in the United States and United Kingdom, Europe and Australia, it is also used as a family name among expatriate families from Kerala.

Origins 
The generally accepted explanation is that this name is of Semitic (Hebrew-Aramaic) origin, presumed to be a derivative of Zecharya (Zacharias or Zechariah) and a variant of Zacharias.  This is supported by the fact that Kerala was one of the chief centers for ancient spice trading between the West and East and there was a historic Nasrani community with religious, linguistic, cultural and genetic connections to the Levant and Middle East. The final -n is the typical Malayalam third-person masculine singular suffix.

There is an alternative hypothesis suggesting an Armenian origin for the name. This relies on the empirical observation that a name ending with ian is highly probable to be an Armenian name. The original candidate Armenian name is Khatcherian which means "follower or son of the Cross". This theory also takes support from the fact that there has been significant presence of Armenians in India, especially Chennai and Kolkata, who migrated to India to escape persecution from Turkey.

Notable people with the name 
Cherian K. Cherian (born 1932), Malayalam–language poet from Kerala
Cheriyan Kalpakavadi, Indian screenwriter for Malayalam films
Cherian Philip (born 1953), politician in Kerala, consultant for Kairali TV and former chairman of KTDC
Accamma Cherian (1909–1982), Indian freedom-fighter
Jacob Cherian (1923–2007), a.k.a. Ayya, Indian surgeon, educationist and social worker
Jayan K. Cherian, Indian poet and filmmaker living in USA
Joy Cherian (born 1942), the first Asian American and first Indian American Commissioner at the United States Equal Employment Opportunity Commission (EEOC)
K. M. Cherian (doctor), Indian heart surgeon who performed India's first coronary artery bypass surgery
K. M. Cherian (journalist) (1897–1973), media personality and chief editor of Malayala Manorama daily
M. K. Cheriyan, Indian teacher, literarian, Biblical scholar and orator
P. V. Cherian (1893–1969), Indian physician, surgeon, politician and Governor (of Maharashtra)
Saji Cheriyan (born 1965), Indian politician
Tara Cherian (1913–2000), Indian social activist and politician, the first woman mayor of Madras city
Tarun Cherian, Indian poet, artist psychic and spiritual healer

Fictional characters

 Neha Cherian, in the novel Five Point Someone by Chetan Bhagat

References

Surnames of Indian origin
Indian surnames